Welcome to Bop City is the first album from Swedish glam metal / hard rock band Kingpin, released in 1988 on the CMM (Club Mariann Music) label in Sweden and in 1989 on the Music For Nations label in the UK. The album was later remixed and released in 1989 under the band's new name Shotgun Messiah on Relativity Records in the US, charting respectably at #99 on Billboard and selling close to half a million copies.

It is the band's only album with Easy Action / Zan Clan singer Zinny J. Zan on vocals, who joined after hearing the band's early demos.

The album was re-released on CD in 2008 on the Italian label Time Warp Records.

Track listing
"Bop City" - 4:06
"Shout It Out" - 4:16
"I Don't Care 'Bout Nothin'" - 4:29
"Squeezin' Teazin'" - 3:58
"The Explorer" (instrumental) - 4:02
"Nowhere Fast" - 4:29
"I'm Your Love" - 5:00
"Dirt Talk" - 4:36 
"Nervous"- 4:27

Personnel
Zinny J. Zan - Vocals
Harry Cody - Guitars 
Tim Tim (Tim Sköld) - Bass
Stixx Galore - Drums
Tord Jacobsson - Drums (on "The Explorer")

References

1988 albums